Koleh Jub (also Romanized as Koleh Jūb and Kalah Jūb; also known as Goleh Jūb, Kaleh Jūb-e ‘Olyā, and Kulajūb) is a village in Howmeh-ye Jonubi Rural District, in the Central District of Eslamabad-e Gharb County, Kermanshah Province, Iran. At the 2006 census, its population was 796, in 192 families.

References 

Populated places in Eslamabad-e Gharb County